Drunk Shakespeare is an Off-Broadway play created by Scott Griffin and David Hudson currently performing at "The Gallery at Green Fig" at 570 10th Ave, 4th Floor (near 42nd Street), New York. It premiered at Quinn's Bar and Grill in March 2014. As of Jan 2019, there have been over 2000 performances. It received a New York Times Critic's Pick saying "it seems inevitable that all performing will soon be done either plastered or stoned". Drunk Shakespeare follows a trend of drinking and performing popularized by the Comedy Central series Drunk History.

It is also performing at "Behind the Chicago Theater" at 182 N Wabash Ave (Near E Lake St), Chicago.

Premise 
The show has five actors. One has between four and six shots of whiskey in front of the audience. The cast then attempts to perform a Shakespearean play. The drunk actor can do anything they want and the four sober actors must follow their requests.

Cast 
Current cast members include: Whit Leyenberger, Michael Amendola, Hayley Palmer, Alison Wien, Mike Sause, Aubrey Taylor, Kelsey Lidsky, Scott Watson, Caitlin Morris, Tim Haber, David Andrew Laws, Danielle Cohn, and Mariah Parris. 

Past cast members include: Damiyr Shuford (now with Blue Man Group), Josh Hyman (now with Men are from Mars, Women are from Venus), Lindsey Hope Pearlman (Up & Down Theatre), Lucas Calhoun (The Elephant Man), Julia Giolzetti, Josh Sauerman (Three Day Hangover), Brandon Carter (Classical Theatre of Harlem), Phil Gillen, Adam Thomas Smith, Poppy Liu, Tiffany Abercrombie, Kristin Friedlander (The Flea, Chicago Shakespeare), Lou Sallan, Chris Gebauer, Monique Sanchez, Elissa Klie, Carolina Do, and Kate Gunther.

References

Off-Broadway plays